Tamara Mitrofanovna Samsonova (born April 25, 1947), known as  Granny Ripper and Baba Yaga, is a Russian alleged serial killer who was arrested in July 2015 on suspicion of committing two murders with extreme cruelty. She supposedly has schizophrenia and was previously hospitalized three times in psychiatric hospitals.

Biography
Samsonova was born on April 25, 1947, in the city of Uzhur, now part of the Krasnoyarsk Krai.

After graduating from high school, she arrived in Moscow and entered the Moscow State Linguistic University. After graduating, she moved to St. Petersburg, where she married Alexei Samsonov. In 1971, she and her husband settled in the newly built panel house number 4 on Dimitrov Street.

For some time she worked for Intourist travel agency, in particular, in the Grand Hotel Europe. The amount of work experience Samsonova gathered at the time of her retirement was 16 years.

In 2000, Samsonova's husband disappeared (she supposedly killed him and got rid of the body). She appealed to the police, but searches yielded nothing. Fifteen years later, in April 2015, she turned towards the authorities again, this time to the investigative unit of the Fruzensky District in St. Petersburg, giving a statement about her spouse's disappearance.

Murders
After her husband's disappearance, Samsonova began renting out a room in her apartment. According to investigators,on September 6, 2003, during a quarrel, she killed her tenant. He was a 44-year-old resident from Norilsk. She then dismembered his corpse and disposed of it on the streets of St. Desyhis Way.

In March 2015 Samsonova met 79-year-old Valentina Nikolaevna Ulanova who also lived on Dimitrov Street. A friend of the two asked Ulanova to shelter Samsonova for a time due to the fact that Samsonova's apartment was being renovated, to which Ulanova agreed. Samsonova lived in Ulanova's apartment for several months, helping with the housework. She began to like living in the apartment, wanting to stay there for longer and refusing to move out. Over time the relationship between the two deteriorated, and Ulanova eventually asked Samsonova to leave.

After another conflict, she decided to poison Ulanova. Samsonova travelled to Pushkin, where she managed to persuade a pharmacist to sell her a prescription drug, phenazepam. Upon returning to the city, she bought an Olivier salad, one of Ulanova's favorite dishes, then put the pills in the salad and gave it to the unsuspecting woman.

Samsonava later found Ulanova's body lying on the kitchen floor on the night of July 23 and proceeded to dismember it with  two knives and a saw. Firstly sawing off the victim's head, she then sawed the body in half and then using the knives, she sheared it into pieces. To take out all the bags outside of the apartment, she had to go outside and return several times. Samsonova left pieces of Ulanova's body scattered in the house.

On the evening of July 26, Ulanova's decapitated body with severed limbs, wrapped in a bathroom curtain, was found near a pond at house number 10 on Dimitrov Street. The package initially didn't attract any attention for several days, until a local resident took an interest in its contents.

The identity of the deceased was established on July 27, after a survey of apartment residents. When they knocked on Ulanova's apartment, Samsonova opened the door to the authorities. Having entered inside, police officers found traces of blood in the bathroom, and also fastening from the torn off curtain. After this, the pensioner was immediately arrested.

Investigation and compulsory treatment
On July 29, 2015, Samsonova was brought to the Frunze District Court of St. Petersburg. She underwent a forensic psychiatric examination, and on November 26, 2015, the results determined that she was a danger to society and herself, and therefore she was placed in a specialized institution until the end of the investigation.

In December 2015, Samsonova was sent for compulsory psychiatric treatment in a specialized hospital in Kazan.

She is being investigated in connection to a total of 14 murders.

According to media reports, police found a diary which contained details of some of the murders. One entry, translated from Russian to English, read: “I killed my tenant Volodya, cut him to pieces in the bathroom with a knife and put the pieces of his body in plastic bags and threw them away in the different parts of Frunzensky District.” ;3

See also
 List of Russian serial killers
 List of serial killers by number of victims

References

1947 births
Living people
Criminals from Saint Petersburg
People with schizophrenia
Suspected serial killers
Moscow State Linguistic University alumni